Tarnawatka  is a village in Tomaszów Lubelski County, Lublin Voivodeship, in eastern Poland. It is the seat of the gmina (administrative district) called Gmina Tarnawatka.

References

Villages in Tomaszów Lubelski County